Hubbard is an English surname. The name is a variant of the surnames Hobart, Hubbert, and Hubert. These surnames are derived from personal names, such as the Old German Hugibert and Hubert, which are composed of the elements hug ("heart", "mind", "spirit") and berht ("bright", "famous"). Early forms of the surname include filius Huberti (in 1066), Hubert (in 1199) Huberd and Hubert (in 1230), and Hoberd (in 1291).

People with the surname 
Al Hubbard (disambiguation), multiple people
Alfred Hubbard (disambiguation), multiple people
Alice Moore Hubbard (1861–1915), American feminist
Allan Hubbard (disambiguation), multiple people
Archie Hubbard (1883–1967), English footballer
Arthur Hubbard (born 1911), English footballer
Arthur J. Hubbard Sr. (1912–2014), American senator and Navajo code talker
Asahel W. Hubbard (1819–1879), American politician
Barbara Burke Hubbard (born 1948), American science writer
Barbara Marx Hubbard (born 1929), American writer
Bela Hubbard (1814–1896), American geologist, surveyor
Bertha Crawford Hubbard (1861–1935), American artist
Bruce Hubbard (1952–1991), American singer
Cal Hubbard (1900–1977), American professional football player and Major League Baseball umpire
Carroll Hubbard (1937–2022), American politician
Charles Hubbard (disambiguation), multiple people
Chester D. Hubbard (1814–1891), American politician
Chris Hubbard (born 1991), American football player
Chuba Hubbard (born 1999), Canadian-born American football player
Cliff Hubbard (1911–1962), English footballer
Conrad Hubbard, role-playing game writer, poet and professional web designer
Cora Hubbard (born 1887), American bank robber
David Hubbard (disambiguation), multiple people
Dean L. Hubbard (born 1939), American educator
DeHart Hubbard (1903–1976), American athlete
Demas Hubbard Jr. (1806–1873), American politician
Diana Hubbard (born 1952), American musician
Dick Hubbard (born 1946), New Zealand businessman and politician
Dominic Hubbard, 6th Baron Addington (born 1963), British politician
Eddie Hubbard (c. 1918–2007), American disc jockey
Edward Hubbard (1937–1989), English architectural historian
Edward L. Hubbard (born 1938), American air force officer
Egerton Hubbard, 2nd Baron Addington (1842–1915), British politician
Elbert Hubbard (1856–1915), American philosopher and writer
Elbert H. Hubbard (1849–1912), American politician
Elizabeth Hubbard (born 1933), American actress
Elizabeth Hubbard (Salem witch trials) (born 1675), accuser in Salem witchcraft trials
Elizabeth Wright Hubbard (1896–1967), American physician
Erica Hubbard (born 1979), American actress
Esme Hubbard (1880–1951), British actor
Evelyn Hubbard (1852–1934), British politician
Frank Hubbard (1920–1976), American harpsichord maker
Freddie Hubbard (1938–2008), American jazz trumpeter
Freeman H. Hubbard (1894–1981), American writer
Gardiner Greene Hubbard (1822–1897), the founder and first president of the National Geographic Society
Geoffrey Hubbard (1923–1998), British educator
George Hubbard (1867–1931), English rugby union player
Glenn Hubbard (disambiguation), multiple people
Gurdon Saltonstall Hubbard (1802–1886), American fur trader, insurance underwriter and land speculator
Harlan Hubbard (1900–1988), Kentucky writer and artist
Harold Hubbard (1883–1953), English bishop
Harry Hubbard (1903–1942), American naval officer
Henry Hubbard (1784–1857), American politician
Henry D. Hubbard (1870–1943), American standards officer, creator of a 1920s Periodic Table.
Henry Guernsey Hubbard (1850–1899), American scientist
Henry Vincent Hubbard (1875–1945), American landscape architect
Homer C. Hubbard (1885–1955), American football coach
Howard James Hubbard (born 1938), U.S. Catholic bishop
Jack Hubbard (1886–1978), American football player
Jaime Hubbard (born 1962), American actress
James Hubbard (disambiguation), multiple people
Jeff Hubbard, American bodyboarder
Jeremy Hubbard (born 1972), American news anchor
Jerry Reed Hubbard (1937–2008), American musician
Jesse Hubbard (born 1975), American lacrosse player
Joe Hubbard, Alabama politician
Joel Douglas Hubbard (1860–1919), American politician
John Hubbard (disambiguation), multiple people
Johnny Hubbard (1930–2018), South African footballer
Jon Hubbard (born 1970), English politician
Jonathan Hatch Hubbard (1768–1849), American politician
Jordan Hubbard (born 1963), co-founder of the FreeBSD operating system project
Joseph Stillman Hubbard (1823–1863), American astronomer
Julian Hubbard (born 1955), British clergyman
Kenneth Hubbard (1920–2004), British pilot
Kin Hubbard (1868–1930), American cartoonist, humorist, and journalist
L. Ron Hubbard (1911–1986), American writer and creator of Scientology
Lafayette Ron Hubbard Jr., known as Ronald DeWolf (1934–1991), son and critic of L. Ron Hubbard
Laurel Hubbard (born 1978), New Zealand weightlifter
Lawrence Hubbard, American artist
Leigh Hubbard, Australian union official
Leonard Hubbard, American musician
Leonidas Hubbard (1872–1903), American journalist and adventurer
Levi Hubbard (1762–1836), American politician
Louisa Hubbard (1836–1906), English feminist
Lucien Hubbard (1888–1971), Producer and screenwriter
Lucius Frederick Hubbard (1836–1913), American politician
Mabel Gardiner Hubbard (1857–1923), wife of Alexander Graham Bell
Marian E. Hubbard (1868–1956), American zoologist
Marvin Hubbard (born 1946), American football player
Mary Sue Hubbard (1931–2002), wife of L. Ron Hubbard
Matt Hubbard, American writer
Matt Hubbard (musician) (born 1970), American musician
Mike Hubbard (disambiguation), multiple people
Nancy Hubbard (born 1963), American author and professor of business and management
Neil Hubbard (born 1948), British guitarist
Neilson Hubbard (born 1972), American musician
Nicholas L. Hubbard (1895–1983), American farmer, businessman, and politician
Old Mother Hubbard (criminal) (1828-1???), Irish-American criminal
Orville L. Hubbard (1903–1982), American politician
P. M. Hubbard (Philip Maitland Hubbard, 1910–1980), British writer
Paul Hubbard (disambiguation), multiple people
Phil Hubbard (born 1956), American basketball player
Phil Hubbard (footballer) (born 1949), English footballer
Philip Hubbard (disambiguation), multiple people
Polly Hubbard (1907–1963), First wife of L. Ron Hubbard
Quentin Hubbard (1954–1976), son of L. Ron Hubbard
Ray Wylie Hubbard (born 1946), American country music singer
Raymond Hubbard, 4th Baron Addington (1884–1971), British peer
Richard Hubbard (disambiguation), multiple people
Richie Hubbard (1932–2011), Canadian politician
Rob Hubbard (born 1955), British composer
Rudy Hubbard (born 1946), American football coach
Ruth Hubbard (1924–2016), American biologist
Sam Hubbard (born 1996), American football player
Samuel Hubbard (disambiguation), multiple people
Sara Hubbard (1924–1997), Second wife of L. Ron Hubbard
Shirley Hubbard (1885–1962), English footballer
Stanley Hubbard (born 1933), American billionaire heir and businessman
Susan Hubbard, American writer
Susan S. Hubbard, American geophysicist 
Theodora Kimball Hubbard (1877–1935), American librarian
Thomas Hubbard (disambiguation), multiple people
Tom Hubbard (born 1950), Scottish poet
Trenidad Hubbard (born 1966), former Major League Baseball outfielder
Tyler Hubbard (born 1987), American musician
Vic Hubbard (born 1956), English darts player
Vikki Hubbard (born 1989), English athlete
Wesley James Hubbard, American musician
Will Hubbard (1895–1969), British WWI flying ace
William Hubbard (disambiguation), multiple people

See also
Hubbard (disambiguation), a disambiguation page for "Hubbard"

References

English-language surnames
Surnames from given names